Setolestes is a genus of parasitic flies in the family Tachinidae. There is one described species in Setolestes, S. genalis.

References

Dexiinae
Diptera of South America
Tachinidae genera
Taxa named by John Merton Aldrich